The 10th Mountain Division Artillery (DIVARTY) is the divisional artillery command for the 10th Mountain Division. The DIVARTY served with the division from 1942 to the present, including fighting in World War II, Somalia and in Afghanistan and Iraq, and in peacetime in Germany; Fort Benning, Georgia; Fort Riley, Kansas; and Fort Drum, New York.

History

World War II
During the Second World War, the divisional artillery included the 604th Field Artillery Battalion (Pack); the 605th Field Artillery Battalion (Pack); and the 616th Field Artillery Battalion (Pack).

Early Cold War - Gyroscope and inactivation

Reincarnation as light infantry division

Lineage 
Constituted in the Regular Army on 28 May 1930 as Headquarters and Headquarters Battery, 10th Field Artillery Brigade, assigned to the Panama Canal Division, and allotted to the Panama Canal Department
Consolidated on 12 October 1936 with the 10th Field Artillery Brigade, 10th Division (a World War I unit organized in August 1918 at Camp Funston, Kansas; demobilized in February 1919 at Camp Funston; reconstituted on 12 October 1936)
Constituted 27 August 1942 in the Army of the United States as Headquarters and Headquarters Battery, Mountain Training Center Artillery
Activated 5 September 1942 at Camp Carson, Colorado
Reorganized and redesignated 15 July 1943 as Headquarters and Headquarters Detachment, 10th Light Division Artillery
Reorganized and redesignated 6 November 1944 as Headquarters and Headquarters Battery, 10th Mountain Division Artillery
Inactivated 30 November 1945 at Camp Carson, Colorado
Redesignated 18 June 1948 as Headquarters and Headquarters Battery, 10th Division Artillery
Allotted 25 June 1948 to the Regular Army
Activated 1 July 1948 at Fort Riley, Kansas
Redesignated 1 July 1957 as Headquarters and Headquarters Battery, 10th Infantry Division Artillery
Inactivated 14 June 1958 at Fort Benning, Georgia
Redesignated 2 May 1987 as Headquarters and Headquarters Battery, 10th Mountain Division Artillery, and activated at Fort Drum, New York
Inactivated 6 August 2004 at Fort Drum, New York
Activated 16 October 2015 at Fort Drum, New York

Note: the linkage between the 10th Mountain Division Artillery and the 10th FA Bde (Panama Canal Dept) and 10th FA Bde (10th Division) is tenuous, and may not bear out when the Army updates the official lineage.

Campaign participation credit 
World War II: North Apennines, Po Valley
War on Terror: campaigns to be determined

Army Football uniforms
In December 2017, the Army Black Knights football team wore all-white uniforms honoring the 10th Mountain Division in their annual rivalry game against the Navy Midshipmen football team.

References

Further reading
Avallone, Paul. 2007. "Afghan Patrol -- A Platoon's Eye View - A Former Soldier Turned Embedded Journalist Accompanied a 10th Mountain Division (Light Infantry) Company During Operation Frozen Turkey in Afghanistan". ARMY Magazine. 57, no. 8: 36.
Steele, Dennis. 2007. "Patrol Base Dragon: Living in 'al Qaeda Land' - Soldiers from the 10th Mountain Division (Light Infantry) Have Occupied a Derelict Power Plant Southwest of Baghdad and Are Using It As a Patrol Base, Just a Few Paces from the Operating Area of Al Qaeda in Iraq". Army. 57, no. 5: 18.
John B. Wilson, ''Maneuver and Firepower: The Evolution of Divisions and Separate Brigades," (1998), Center of Military History, Publication 60-14 

010
Military units and formations established in 1944
10th Mountain Division (United States)